Don McNeill's Breakfast Club was a long-running morning variety show on NBC Blue Network/ABC radio (and briefly on television) originating in Chicago, Illinois. Hosted by Don McNeill, the radio program ran from June 23, 1933, through December 27, 1968. McNeil's 35½-year run as host remains the longest tenure for an emcee of a network entertainment program, surpassing Johnny Carson (29½ years) on The Tonight Show and Bob Barker (34⅔ years) on The Price Is Right, albeit split between radio and television, whereas the latter two were television only.

History
In Chicago during the early 1930s, McNeill was assigned to take over an unsponsored early morning variety show, The Pepper Pot, with an 8 a.m. timeslot on the NBC Blue Network. McNeill re-organized the hour as The Breakfast Club, dividing it into four segments which McNeill labeled "the Four Calls to Breakfast".

McNeill's revamped show premiered in 1933, combining music with informal talk and jokes often based on topical events, initially scripted by McNeill but later ad-libbed. In addition to recurring comedy performers, various vocal groups and soloists, listeners heard sentimental verse, conversations with members of the studio audience and a silent moment of prayer. The series eventually gained a sponsor in the Chicago-based meat packer Swift and Company, beginning February 8, 1941. McNeill is credited as the first performer to make morning talk and variety a viable radio format.

The program featured Fran Allison (later of Kukla, Fran and Ollie fame) as "Aunt Fanny", plus Captain Stubby and the Buccaneers and various comedy bits. Every quarter-hour came the "Call to Breakfast"—a march around the breakfast table. A featured vocalist on the show, under her professional name of Annette King, was Charlotte Thompson Reid, who later became an Illinois congresswoman for five terms (1962–71). Eileen Parker became a vocalist with the program in 1953.

Broadcast venues and networks
The Breakfast Club initially was broadcast from the NBC studios in the Merchandise Mart. In 1948, after 4,500 broadcasts from the Merchandise Mart, the program moved to the new ABC Civic Studio. It was also heard from other Chicago venues: the Terrace Casino (at the Morrison Hotel), the College Inn Porterhouse (at the Sherman House) and the Cloud Room of the Warwick Allerton Hotel  on Chicago's Magnificent Mile," as well as tour broadcasts from other locations in the U.S. It remained a fixture on the ABC radio network (formerly the NBC Blue Network; it became known as ABC in 1945), maintaining its popularity for years and counting among its fans Supreme Court Associate Justice William O. Douglas.

After ABC Radio was split into four networks in 1968, The Breakfast Club was moved to the new American Entertainment network, and was known for its last months on the air as The Don McNeill Show.

Television
Beginning on September 5, 1950, the show aired as TV Club (aka Don McNeill's TV Club) on ABC in the 1950-51 prime time season in a 60-minute version, Wednesdays at 9pm ET. From September to December 1951, the show returned to ABC in a 30-minute version, Wednesdays from 9pm to 9:30pm ET.

Beginning on February 22, 1954, and ending on February 25, 1955, Don McNeill's Breakfast Club was simulcast in its regular morning slot on ABC Radio and ABC Television. However, it failed to make a successful transition to television in either version.

On May 12, 1948, the program was shown on the DuMont television station WABD in New York, "simulcast" with the ABC radio show, as an experiment. At least two kinescope recordings survive of these telecasts, including a February 17, 1954 "test kinescope," produced a week before the regular ABC simulcasts began.

Book
John Doolittle's book about this program, Don McNeill and His Breakfast Club (University of Notre Dame Press, 2001), was reviewed by Susan M. Colowick in Library Journal:
Before Garrison was even a twinkle in Mr. Keillor's eye, Don McNeill launched a radio show with a unique mix of humor, music and audience participation. From 1933 to 1968, the Chicago-based Breakfast Club aired every weekday on the ABC radio network (originally NBC's Blue Network). Millions of Americans tuned in to hear songs, jokes, interviews, the "March Around the Breakfast Table," the "Moment of Silent Prayer" and other regular features. (Except for his strong support of public prayer, McNeill eschewed politics, though he did run for president in 1948 on the Laugh Party ticket.) In this thoroughly researched and highly readable account, Doolittle reminds us just how popular Breakfast Club really was, especially with homemakers of modest means but also with the likes of J. Edgar Hoover and Justice William O. Douglas. Many show business celebrities were guests on the show, including Jimmy Stewart, Lucille Ball and Jerry Lewis. The book is accompanied by a CD that features clips from actual shows.

See also
1950-51 United States network television schedule
1951-52 United States network television schedule

References

Bibliography
David Weinstein, The Forgotten Network: DuMont and the Birth of American Television (Philadelphia: Temple University Press, 2004) 
Alex McNeil, Total Television, Fourth edition (New York: Penguin Books, 1980) 
Tim Brooks and Earle Marsh, The Complete Directory to Prime Time Network TV Shows, Third edition (New York: Ballantine Books, 1964) 

Dunning, John. On the Air: The Encyclopedia of Old-Time Radio. Oxford University Press, 1998.

Listen to
The Breakfast Club on December 8, 1941 (interrupted by war bulletins)
Rich Samuels' tribute to The Breakfast Club (February 2004)

External links

Marquette University: Donald T. McNeill Collection, 1928-69
 
1948 kinescope of DuMont TV and ABC Radio simulcast (May 12, 1948) at the Internet Archive

Breakfast Club timeline
1954 American television series debuts
1955 American television series endings
1930s American radio programs
1940s American radio programs
1950s American radio programs
1960s American radio programs
ABC radio programs
American Broadcasting Company original programming
Breakfast Club, The
Black-and-white American television shows
English-language television shows
NBC Blue Network radio programs